Der Beste (The Old Pro) is a mystery short film written and directed by Arne Jysch and Rasmus Borowski.

Premise 
Harry, an aging pro named the "best" is offered the job of his lifetime: a mysterious lady lures him into her dark, castle-like abode for a last and highly paid assignment that is to surpass even Harry's own fantasy.

DVD release 
Der Beste (The Old Pro) was released in 2006 by 13th Street and Concorde Home Entertainment on the DVD Shocking Shorts 3.

Awards 
 2006: Shocking Shorts Award - NBCUniversal / 13th Street
 2006: Murnau-Kurzfilmpreis - Friedrich-Wilhelm-Murnau-Stiftung
 2006: Best European Short Film - FIKE Film Festival, Évora
 2006: Audience Award of Lund International Fantastic Film Festival
 2006: Golden Méliès Nomination - Lund International Fantastic Film Festival
 2005: Best Independent Shortfilm - Festival of Fantastic Films, Manchester
 2005: Winner Audience Award - BIFFF Film Festival, Brüssel
 2005: Prädikat: Besonders Wertvoll - Deutsche Film- und Medienbewertung (FBW)

External links 
Official Site

Website of Composer/Director Rasmus Borowski

References 

2004 films
German short films
2000s mystery films
2000s German films